Oreste Ramos Díaz is a Puerto Rican intellectual, lawyer, politician and former senator. He served as a member of the Senate of Puerto Rico from 1977 to 1996, representing the New Progressive Party (PNP).

Ramos was first elected to the Senate of Puerto Rico at the 1976 elections. He represented the District of San Juan, and was reelected in 1980, 1984, 1988, and 1992.

In 2008, Ramos attempted a comeback, but was defeated at the PNP primaries. The next year, Ramos was one of the candidates considered to fill the vacancy left by former senator Jorge de Castro Font, who resigned to his chair after being convicted by federal authorities. However, Melinda Romero was chosen.

After that, Ramos has worked as a legal advisor for the Senate and for Representative Liza Fernández.

References

External links
Asamblea Legislativa 2008

Living people
Members of the Senate of Puerto Rico
New Progressive Party (Puerto Rico) politicians
Year of birth missing (living people)